The Mountain Line provides public transportation bus service in the Flagstaff area of Coconino County, Arizona. It started in 2001, replacing the county-run Pine Country Transit.

Routes
There are nine routes currently in service (2, 3, 4, 5, 7, 8, 10, 14 and 66). Every route currently in service interchanges at the downtown connection center, located on W. Phoenix Ave at S. Mikes Pike and at the Flagstaff Mall connection center located on E. Mall Way and N. Marketplace Dr. at which 3 routes (2, 3, 66) transfer.
Paratransit service in Flagstaff is supplied by Mountain Lift, another operation of NAIPTA.

Routes currently in service:
 Route 2 (Blue Line) – Downtown to Flagstaff Mall via Cedar/Lockett
 Route 3 (Green Line) – Downtown to Flagstaff Mall via Butler/Soliere
 Route 4 (Gold Line) – Downtown to Coconino Community College
 Route 5 (Orange Line) – Downtown to Cheshire
 Route 7 (Purple Line) – Downtown to Sunnyside
 Route 8 (Teal Line) – Downtown to Woodlands Village
 Route 10 (Maroon Line) – Downtown Connection Center to Woodlands Village via Northern Arizona University
 Route 14 (Brown Line) – Runs the same route but opposite direction as Route 4.
 Route 66 (Red Line) – Downtown to Christmas Tree Estates. (Was originally Route 1)

Bus Fleet

Current roster

Retired Roster

References

External links
 Mountain Line Homepage Arizona
 Northern Arizona Intergovernmental Public Transportation Authority (NAIPTA)

Bus transportation in Arizona
Transportation in Coconino County, Arizona
Transit agencies in Arizona